Laban Theodore Moore (January 13, 1829 – November 9, 1892) was a U.S. Representative from Kentucky.

Born in Wayne County, Virginia (now West Virginia), near Louisa, Kentucky, Moore attended Marshall Academy now Marshall University in Virginia and was graduated from Marietta College in Ohio. He attended Transylvania Law College in Lexington, Kentucky. Moore was admitted to the bar in 1849 and commenced practice in Louisa, Kentucky. He was an unsuccessful candidate for election in 1857 to the Kentucky State House of Representatives.

Moore was elected as an Opposition Party candidate to the Thirty-sixth Congress (March 4, 1859 - March 3, 1861). He was not a candidate for renomination in 1860. During the Civil War he established and enlisted in the 14th Kentucky Infantry, of which he was elected colonel on November 19, 1861. He later resigned from this position on January 1, 1862 and  moved to Catlettsburg, Kentucky, where he resumed practicing law.

In 1868, Moore's wife purchased the Catlett House in Catlettsburg. Once under his ownership, he named the house Beechmoor for the large beech tree that stood on the property and for his surname.

Moore became a Democrat after the war and served as member of the Kentucky State Senate in 1881. He served as member of the Kentucky State Constitutional Convention in 1890 and 1891. Moore died in Catlettsburg on November 9, 1892 and was interred at Ashland Cemetery in Ashland, Kentucky.

References

1829 births
1892 deaths
People from Wayne County, West Virginia
Opposition Party members of the United States House of Representatives from Kentucky
Kentucky Democrats
Union Army officers
People of Kentucky in the American Civil War
People from Catlettsburg, Kentucky
19th-century American politicians
Members of the United States House of Representatives from Kentucky